Adam D. Smith is a computer scientist at Boston University, where he is a founding member of the Faculty of Computing & Data Sciences. His areas of research include cryptography and information privacy. He is known, along with Cynthia Dwork, Frank McSherry, and Kobbi Nissim, as one of the co-inventors of differential privacy, for which he won the 2017 Gödel Prize.

References 

Living people
American computer scientists
Gödel Prize laureates
Boston University faculty
American cryptographers
Year of birth missing (living people)